Crocus cancellatus is a species of flowering plant in the genus Crocus of the family Iridaceae, found from the Balkan Peninsula to Iran. 
Crocus cancellatus is a corm growing to 0.1 m (0 ft 4in) by 0.1 m (0 ft 4in). It is hardy to zone (UK) 5 and is not frost tender. It is in flower from September to November, and the seeds ripen from March to May.

References

cancellatus
Plants described in 1841